Liu Ruicheng (born 28 April 1999) is a Chinese footballer currently playing as a left-back for Kunshan.

Career statistics

Club
.

References

1999 births
Living people
Footballers from Yunnan
Chinese footballers
Association football defenders
China League One players
Guangzhou F.C. players
Inner Mongolia Zhongyou F.C. players
Xinjiang Tianshan Leopard F.C. players
Kunshan F.C. players
21st-century Chinese people